The covered passages of Paris are an early form of shopping arcade built in Paris, France primarily during the first half of the 19th century. By the 1867 there were approximately 183 covered passages in Paris but this decreased greatly as a result of Haussmann's renovation of Paris. Only a couple of dozen passages remain in the 21st century, all on the Right Bank. The common characteristics of the covered passages are that they are: pedestrianised; glass-ceilings; artificially illuminated at night (initially with gas lamps); privately owned; highly ornamented and decorated; lined with small shops on the ground floor; connecting two streets. Originally, to keep the passages clean, each would have an artiste de décrottage (a shit-removal artist) at the entrance to clean the shoes of visitors.

The passages were the subject of Walter Benjamin's incomplete magnum-opus Passagenwerk (Arcades Project) which was posthumously published.

List of currently accessible passages 
The following table lists the covered passages that still exist and remain accessible to the public.

Further reading

References

External links